Gardan (also Romanized as Gardān; also known as Qal‘eh Now) is a village in Binalud Rural District, in the Central District of Nishapur County, Razavi Khorasan Province, Iran. At the 2006 census, its population was 9, in 4 families.

References 

Populated places in Nishapur County